Theodorus Johannes Antonius Maria "Dirk Jan" van Hameren (born 14 July 1965) is a Dutch track cyclist. He competed in the men's sprint and men's 1 km time trial at the 1992 Summer Olympics and in the men's 1 km time trial at the 1996 Summer Olympics.

See also
 List of Dutch Olympic cyclists

References

1965 births
Living people
Dutch male cyclists
Olympic cyclists of the Netherlands
Cyclists at the 1992 Summer Olympics
Cyclists at the 1996 Summer Olympics
Sportspeople from Leiden
Cyclists from South Holland